Pukekura is located near Lake Ianthe in the West Coast region of the South Island.  passes through Pukekura on its route between Ross and Harihari, and the settlement is roughly 35 minutes south of Hokitika and an hour north of Franz Josef Glacier. It claimed to be the smallest town on the West Coast, with a population of two, though this was larger in past times when it was a saw-milling settlement. Timber was cut in the area from the early 1950s until the mid-1980s, and the town had been re-established as a tourist centre for a limited time, with a Bushman's Centre, pub, and accommodation. While the pub and the Bushman's Centre are closed as of 2020, accommodation facilities remain. The current population is 6, and the forest around the town is now a protected forest.

A possible translation of the name from Māori to English is "red hill".

References

External links 
Official website of Pukekura (South Island township)

Westland District
Populated places in the West Coast, New Zealand